Aristeguietia is a genus of about 21 species of flowering plants in the tribe Eupatorieae of the family Asteraceae. It is found from Colombia to southern Peru, with one species in Chile.

 Species

References

 
Asteraceae genera
Flora of South America
Taxonomy articles created by Polbot